Angermünde station is a transportation hub in the city of Angermünde in the northeast of the German state of Brandenburg. The station opened on 15 November 1842 on the Stettin Railway between Berlin and Szczecin and is the starting point of the Angermünde-Stralsund line to Stralsund, the Angermünde-Schwedt line to Schwedt and a disused branch line to Bad Freienwalde.

History
The station was opened on 15 November 1842 by the Berlin-Stettin Railway Company (BStE) with the line from Berlin. On 15 August 1843, the extension to Szczecin (then part of Prussia and called Stettin in German) was opened. In the following years the station grew into a major junction with the opening of lines to Stralsund (1863), Schwedt (1873) and Bad Freienwalde (1877). In 1879, the BStE was nationalised as part of the Prussian state railways. The station was originally built on an “island” surrounded by tracks (known as an Inselbahnhof in German). In 1906, the tracks were redesigned and all the tracks were moved to the west side of the building. In 1861 the original station building was replaced by a new building. The old building later served as a post office and a police station, but it is now unused. As a result of numerous changes to the building during the period of East Germany (1945–1990) the old building has disappeared. The station complex is a listed building.

Train services
Angermünde station is west of central Angermünde. The station building is east of the tracks. The station has two island platforms with four tracks for passenger traffic. At the northern end of the western platform, there is an additional terminal track. Freight facilities are close to the northern end of the passenger station. The line to Schwedt branches directly in the platform area from the other tracks so that only tracks 1 and 2 can be used by trains to and from Schwedt.

The station is served by the following service(s):

Intercity-Express services (ICE 28) (Binz -) Stralsund - Eberswalde - Berlin - Leipzig - Jena - Nuremberg - Munich (- Innsbruck)
Intercity services (IC 32) Binz - Stralsund - Eberswalde - Berlin - Hanover - Dortmund - Essen - Duisburg - Düsseldorf - Cologne
Regional services  Stralsund - Greifswald - Pasewalk - Angermünde - Berlin - Ludwigsfelde - Jüterbog - Falkenberg - Elsterwerda
Regional services  Schwedt - Angermünde - Berlin - Ludwigsfelde - Jüterbog - Lutherstadt Wittenberg
Regional services  Berlin - Bernau - Eberswalde - Angermünde - Szczecin
Local services  Schwedt - Angermünde
Local services  Prenzlau - Angermünde (- Eberswalde)
Local services  Angermünde - Szczecin

Notes

References

External links 

 

Railway stations in Brandenburg
Buildings and structures in Uckermark (district)
Railway stations in Germany opened in 1842
1842 establishments in Prussia